Francesco Palmieri (born 31 July 1975 in Pisa) is an Italian retired footballer. He played as a goalkeeper. He played in Serie B for Lucchese and Livono and was the third goalkeeper of A.C.F. Fiorentina in Serie A from 2003 to 2005.

Career a player
1993–1995  Lucchese 2 (-2)
1995–1996  Prato 2 (-2)
1996–1998  Livorno 24 (-22)
1998–1999  Maceratese 17 (-21)
1999  Triestina 11 (-7)
1999–2000  Sanremese 7 (-8)
2000–2003  Livorno 6 (-5)
2003–2005  Fiorentina 0 (0)
2005–2006  Pisa 1 (-1)

External links

 lega-calcio.it

1975 births
Living people
Italian footballers
Serie B players
S.S.D. Lucchese 1905 players
A.C. Prato players
U.S. Livorno 1915 players
U.S. Triestina Calcio 1918 players
S.S.D. Sanremese Calcio players
Pisa S.C. players
Association football goalkeepers